Justin Spitzer is an American television and film writer, producer, and series creator whose credits include Scrubs and Courting Alex. He worked as a writing assistant on Queer as Folk (U.S. version) and Grounded for Life prior to serving as a writer on The Office (U.S. version) for seven years. He is the creator of, and an executive producer on, the NBC sitcom Superstore, and served as the series' showrunner for its first three seasons.

Career 
Spitzer was an assistant on Grounded for Life, and on fourteen episodes of Queer as Folk. In 2013 he wrote a pilot based on The Money Pit that was put into development by NBC but ultimately never aired. He is the creator, showrunner and executive producer for the NBC sitcom Superstore.

On January 23, 2020, NBC ordered a pilot for Spitzer's comedy American Auto for Kapital Entertainment and Universal Television. In August 2021, Spitzer had signed a new four-year overall deal with Universal Television.

Personal life 
On November 24, 2007, he married producer and writer Jenna Bans. They have two children named Lucy and Phoebe.

Credits

Producing

Writing

Directing

Nominations

External links 

Justin Spitzer on Twitter

References 

American television producers
American television writers
American male television writers
Living people
Place of birth missing (living people)
Year of birth missing (living people)